Paul Bottomley (born 11 September 1965 in Harrogate) is an English former professional footballer who played on loan for Doncaster Rovers in the Football League as a defender. The club wanted to sign Bottomley on a permanent deal; however he opted to remain part-time when his loan spell expired.

Career statistics

References

1965 births
Living people
Sportspeople from Harrogate
English footballers
Association football defenders
Guiseley A.F.C. players
Bridlington Town A.F.C. players
Doncaster Rovers F.C. players
Whitby Town F.C. players
Harrogate Town A.F.C. players
Accrington Stanley F.C. players
English Football League players